Darren Anderson may refer to:

 Darren Anderson (American football) (born 1969), former American football player
 Darren Anderson (footballer) (born 1966), English footballer
 Darren Anderson (dancer) (born 1976), ballet dancer